Sir Jasper More  (born Chelsea, 31 July 1907 – died Clun, 28 October 1987) was a British Conservative Party politician, the son of Sir Thomas Jasper Mytton More (died 1947), a Shropshire landowner, and Lady Norah Browne, daughter of Henry Browne, 5th Marquess of Sligo. He was knighted in 1979.

More was educated at Eton College and King's College, Cambridge, becoming a barrister, called by Lincoln's Inn and Middle Temple in 1930. His career at the bar ended with the outbreak of World War II. He was a civilian employee of the Ministry of Economic Warfare and the Ministry of Aircraft Production and Light Metals Control until 1942, was commissioned as an Army legal officer on the General List in 1943, and was in Italy until 1945 and with the military government of the Dodecanese until 1946. In 1944, he married Clare Hope-Edwards, also a Shropshire landowner. They had no children.

He was a landowner and farmer and chaired the Shropshire branch of the Country Landowners' Association 1955–60. He became a Shropshire County Councillor in 1958, and was later a deputy lieutenant and justice of the peace.

During the 1960s More joined the Conservative Monday Club, and he was elected Member of Parliament for Ludlow in a 1960 by-election, a seat he held until 1979, preceding Eric Cockeram.  He introduced the Deer Act, 1963 to protect deer not kept in enclosed parks. More was made a government whip in February 1964, then become an opposition whip, and again for the government benches from 1970 to 1971, when he resigned in disagreement with the government's policy on the European Economic Community. He was still a member of the Monday Club in May 1975.

More was politically unambitious, gaining his whip posts largely through conscientious attendance. He principally devoted himself to life as a country squire. He authored several books, including The Saving of Income Tax, Surtax and Death Duties, The Land of Italy, and the Shell Guide to English Villages.

References

Review of The Saving of Income Tax, Surtax and Death Duties
Times Guide to the House of Commons October 1974

External links 
 

1907 births
1987 deaths
British Army General List officers
Conservative Party (UK) MPs for English constituencies
People educated at Eton College
UK MPs 1959–1964
UK MPs 1964–1966
UK MPs 1966–1970
UK MPs 1970–1974
UK MPs 1974
UK MPs 1974–1979
Members of the Parliament of the United Kingdom for constituencies in Shropshire
Councillors in Shropshire
Deputy Lieutenants of Shropshire
Knights Bachelor
Politicians awarded knighthoods
Civil servants in the Ministry of Aircraft Production